Stroud FM was a community radio station based in Stroud, Gloucestershire which broadcast from March 2008 to February 2014 on 107.9 FM  and online via its website.

It was launched on 24 March 2008 although had produced live radio covering the Stroud Fringe Festival many years before. The station ran as a 'not-for profit organisation' and also provided training for IT courses, radio production and employability skills. 

In March 2009, the station marked one year of being on the airwaves. And then in March 2010, then Labour MP David Drew officially opened a new second studio at the station.

In June 2011, the station launched a 'listen again' podcast service. A couple of months later however in September 2011, the station announced it was close to closure because of financial issues. As soon as the news became known the people of the Stroud area rallied to support the station with donations, sponsored swims, cake baking, bucket collections at the local Forest Green Rovers football ground, benefit gigs etc. The result was that Stroud FM won a reprieve and a breathing space in which to tackle the situation.

Plans were formed at the start of 2013 to increase the broadcasting range of the station by developing a new location for a transmitter.

On 12 February 2014, it was announced by their newly elected board that the station can no longer broadcast due to a lack of funding.

This was the notice: Stroud FM Closing Announcement

StroudFM, the local community radio station run by volunteers for the past ten years, is to close.

Despite the hard work of some very dedicated people, the newly elected Board has reviewed the current financial situation and agreed unanimously that the station can no longer broadcast, due to lack of funds. There has been a considerable financial support from Stroud Town Council, local celebrities and local people over the years, and although everyone involved volunteers their time very freely – in addition, all the StroudFM presenters and technicians pay a monthly membership fee – all radio stations cost a substantial amount of money to run.

Since broadcasting full time on 107.9 FM in March 2008, the station has helped teach unemployed people vital skills to help improve their opportunities of getting jobs. The IT facilities at the station have seen classes run for those needing support on that front as well as for the elderly to learn computer skills. Schools and youth organisations have also benefited from training with the station including recovering addicts.

In March 2010 former Stroud and Labour MP, David Drew, officially opened a brand new second studio at the station with the help of a grant paying for this to take place.

StroudFM's other highlights include:
• Live broadcasts from the Stroud Fringe Festival
• Coverage of local elections
• Regular outside broadcast of match commentaries at Forest Green Rovers
• A listen again service – and online streaming, meaning listeners around the country could also listen

A spokesman from StroudFM said: “On behalf of the Board, I would like to thank Open House, Forrest Green, Stroud Town Council and Stroud District Council, as well as many local businesses for their considerable support over the years, to our listeners both in and outside Stroud, and of course to those volunteers who have given their time and energy."

"At its peak, the station was reaching out to over 1,000 listeners, both live and online. Some 60 presenters regularly recorded and broadcast programmes each week, ranging from music shows to talk shows covering a wide range of topics and local news. We have looked at every way we can to continue, but with a projected shortfall of almost £8,000 the station is simply no longer viable as it stands."

References

External links
Stroud FM website
Time After Time: The Vintage Hour

Radio stations in Gloucestershire
Community radio stations in the United Kingdom